The La France Insoumise group is a parliamentary group in the National Assembly founded following the 2017 legislative election. It is led by Mathilde Panot since 2021, having previously been led by Jean-Luc Mélenchon between 2017 and 2021. The group, which includes representatives of La France Insoumise (FI) and other left-wing parties, currently has seventy five members.

History 

In the 2017 legislative election, La France Insoumise (FI), the movement founded by Jean-Luc Mélenchon prior to the presidential election, failed to secure an alliance with the French Communist Party (PCF) permitting common investitures between the two movements. Both subsequently decided to form separate parliamentary groups; Chassaigne, president of the Democratic and Republican Left group (GDR), declared that his deputies would not actively oppose the FI deputies in the National Assembly. Mélenchon's wish to impose voting discipline upon his group and demand that members respect the movement's program L'Avenir en commun ("The common future") proved a barrier to an alliance between the two groups.

A total of 17 candidates running under the FI label were elected in the second round of the legislative elections, enough for the formation of a parliamentary group. Stéphane Peu, elected under the FI label but a member of the PCF, ultimately chose to remain within the GDR group, while Jean-Hugues Ratenon, who ran under the miscellaneous left label, stated that he intended to sit with the FI group if elected.

On 27 June, Mélenchon was unanimously voted as the president of the group. At the time of its formation on 27 June, the parliamentary group included 17 deputies.

Aymeric Caron from the Ecological Revolution for the Living sits in the group.

Organisation 
Executives of the movement include: Jean-Luc Mélenchon, Danièle Obono, Mathilde Panot, Bastien Lachaud, Alexis Corbière and Éric Coquerel.

Members 

 Ugo Bernalicis
 Michel Larive
 Adrien Quatennens
 Sabine Rubin
 Muriel Ressiguier
 Loïc Prud'homme
 Clémentine Autain
 Caroline Fiat

List of presidents

Historical membership

References

External links 
 Notices and portraits of deputies 
 Changes in the composition of groups 

La France Insoumise
National Assembly (France)
Parliamentary groups in France